Chengbei Subdistrict is a subdistrict and the seat of Shigatse City, Tibet Autonomous Region, People's Republic of China. , it has five residential communities under its administration.

References 

Township-level divisions of Tibet
Samzhubzê District
Subdistricts of the People's Republic of China